Oostvaarders College, also referred to as OVC, is a school located in Almere Buiten, Netherlands.

In the beginning the Oostvaarders College started as a small school, but became one of the largest middle/high schools in Almere with more than 1,500 students. Oostvaarders College is part of the Foundation ABVO Flevoland. This is a foundation for general secondary education especially in Flevoland.

The school is an official UNESCO school.

References

Secondary schools in the Netherlands